Washington State Route 12 may refer to several highways in the U.S. state of Washington:
U.S. Route 12 in Washington
State Road 12 (Washington 1923-1937), the Ocean Beach Highway
Primary State Highway 12 (Washington) (1937-1970), the Ocean Beach Highway
State Road 12 (Washington 1905-1919), the Methow-Barron Road
Washington State Route 12 (1964-1967), now SR 14